The 1995 Kazakhstan Cup Final was the fourth final of the Kazakhstan Cup. The match was contested by Yelimay and SKIF-Ordabasy at Central Stadium in Almaty. The match was played on 7 November 1995 and was the final match of the competition.

Background
Yelimay and SKIF-Ordabasy played the first Kazakhstan Cup Final.

Yelimay and SKIF-Ordabasy was played twice during the season of league. On May 15, 1995 Yelimay won the first competition with the score 1-0 in the K. Munaitpasov Central Stadium. The lone goal was scored by Kairat Aubakirov. On September 28, 1995 Yelimay and SKIF-Ordabasy draw on 2-2. In a match noted goals - Kairat Aubakirov, Eldar Gasanov (all - "Yelimay"), Aleksei Ten and Kanat Musatayev (all - "SKIF-Ordabasy").

Route to the Final

Yelimay

SKIF-Ordabasy

Match

Details

References

1995 domestic association football cups
1995 in Kazakhstani football
Kazakhstan Cup Finals